Antfood is a creative audio studio with offices in New York, São Paulo, and Amsterdam. Antfood is a collaborative of composers, engineers, producers, and sound designers that create audio for film, advertisements, and interactive installations.

The studio is known for their work on the Academy Awards, their multiple collaborations with Buck, and their sound design for virtual reality platforms, including Oculus Rift.

History

Antfood was founded in 2007 in Williamsburg, Brooklyn, New York City, by Wilson Brown an artist and creative entrepreneur, and Emmy-nominated songwriter,  composer and producer Polly Hall.

in 2008 Antfood moved from its original Williamsburg location to a 3000 sq. ft. loft in South Williamsburg, Brooklyn, New York City, near the Domino Sugar Refinery at 221 Jackson Street.

In 2008 Sean McGovern joined Antfood as Executive Producer.

In 2012, Antfood expanded opened its first overseas location in São Paulo, Brazil at Rua Gonçalo Afonso, 71. Music producer, composer, sound designer and instrumentalist Pedro Botsaris heads up the São Paulo location as Executive Creative Director and Partner.

In 2017, Antfood opened its second overseas location in Amsterdam, Netherlands at Achtergracht 17–19, 1017 WL. Antfood's Amsterdam location was launched under the guidance of Pedro Botsaris. 

Operations

Antfood is a privately held company with 32 people on staff worldwide.

Producers, Directors and Partners

New York Location

·        Sue Lee, Executive Producer

·        Wilson Brown, ECD/Partner

Amsterdam Location

·        Pedro Botsaris, CD/Partner

São Paulo Location

·        Christiane Rachel, Executive Producer

·        Lou Schmidt, ECP/Partner

Services

Antfood offers the following services:

·        Original Music

·        3D Audio / 360º / Spatial Sound for AR/VR and physical Installations

·        Supervision and Licensing

·        Sound Branding Strategy

·        Sonic UX / UI

·        Sound Design

·        Sonic Identity

·        Audio Prototyping for New Media, Non-linear, Generative and Interactive Playback

·        Audio Post Production

·        Project Management

Awards

Key Clients:

●     Nike

●     Google

●     Facebook

●     Instagram

●     Casper Sleep

●     Slack

●     Ford Motor Company

●     Verizon

●     Apple, Inc

●     Budweiser

●     Emirates

●     Target

●     American Express

●     Smirnoff

●     Pepsi

●     Gatorade

●     IBM

●     PlayStation

●     Adidas

●     Samsung

●     SoFi

References

External links
 

Mass media companies based in New York City
Mass media companies established in 2000
American companies established in 2000